John Charles Williams (born 8 November 1980) is a former English cricketer.  Williams was a right-handed batsman who bowled right-arm medium pace.  He was born at Weston-super-Mare, Somerset.

Williams represented the Somerset Cricket Board in a single List A match against Staffordshire in the 1st round of the 2000 NatWest Trophy at the Gorway Ground, Walsall.  In his only List A match, he scored 10 runs.

References

External links
John Williams at Cricinfo
John Williams at CricketArchive

1980 births
Living people
People from Weston-super-Mare
Cricketers from Somerset
English cricketers
Somerset Cricket Board cricketers